Billur Kalkavan (2 November 1962 – 15 October 2022) was a Turkish actress and television presenter.

Life and career
Billur Kalkavan was born on 2 November 1962 in the Beylerbeyi neighborhood of Istanbul. Her mother was Nuyan Kalkavan, and her father was shipowner Nazım Kalkavan.

Kalkavan's first cinematic experience was when she was just a seven-year-old girl, playing the role of a child kidnapped for ransom by the villain played by Erol Taş in the film Ayrı Dünyalar (1969). 

Kalkavan started secondary school in the USA, then returned to Turkey and studied at Kadıköy Maarif College. She then dropped out of high school and worked in various jobs since the age of 16. In 1978, she starred in the movie Sultan, directed by Kartal Tibet. She then worked as a secretary at Güneş newspaper for a while. She went back to the United States after the newspaper was sold in 1984 and completed her education by taking the high school graduation exams there. She took psychology classes at the University of California, Los Angeles. She returned to Turkey after living in the USA for four years. 

Kalkavan was a presenter on TRT, acted in television series and became a known figure on Turkish television. She further rose to prominence with her night life and love affairs. She was particularly known for speaking openly about her sexuality, due to which she was described as a "marginal" personality. She was also known for her appearance and the tattoos on her right shoulder, which she had done in Sweden in 1980.  

In 1994, she took part in the music video for the song "Deli Et Beni" by singer . This video turned lesbianism to be a topic in the mainstream media, both because of the lyrics of the song and the dance performed by Billur Kalkavan and Yeşim Salkım.

Kalkavan first appeared on stage in 1996 with a role in Tiyatro Çisenti's play Açık Evlilik. As a shareholder at Tiyatro Çisenti, she also took part in the musical Bir İstanbul Masalı, and in the play Dilekçe. In 2000, she played a stripper in the theater play Marion and Muhammed, staged by the New Theatre in Istanbul. The striptease scene in the play caused a sensation at the time. 

Beginning in the 1990s, she appeared in the movies Mavi Sürgün, Gece Otostopçusu, Ölüm Peşimizde, Kraliçe Fabrika'da, Mezuniyet, Çarşı Pazar, and Canavar Gibi: Türk İşi Frankeştayn. She also appeared in the TV series Tatlı Kaçıklar, Böyle mi Olacaktı, and Eyvah Babam.

Kalkavan came to the fore again with her nude poses for a series in 2008. In 2012, she presented a talk show about sexual life on the television channel HTV, which broadcasts health-related programs.

Death 
Kalkavan died on 15 October 2022 at a hospital in Istanbul where she was undergoing treatment for lung cancer. Following a funeral service on 17 October, she was buried at Zincirlikuyu Cemetery.

Filmography

References

External links
 

1962 births
2022 deaths
20th-century Turkish actresses
21st-century Turkish actresses
Actresses from Istanbul
Burials at Zincirlikuyu Cemetery
Deaths from lung cancer in Turkey
Kadıköy Anadolu Lisesi alumni
Ottoman dynasty
Turkish film actresses
Turkish television actresses
Turkish stage actresses
Turkish women television presenters